The Del Mar Futurity is a seven-furlong American Thoroughbred horse race held annually at Del Mar Racetrack in Del Mar, California. A Grade I event since 2007, the race is open to two-year-old horses and offers a purse of $300,000.

In 1971, it was run in two divisions on Turf. From 2007 to 2014, it was run on Polytrack synthetic dirt.

No trainer has more Del Mar Futurity wins than Bob Baffert's 14, seven in consecutive years.

Records
Speed record:
 1:20.99 – Cave Rock (2022) (Dirt)
 1:21.48 – American Pharoah (2014) (Polytrack)

Most wins by a jockey:
 6 – Bill Shoemaker (1954, 1958, 1971–1974)

Most wins by a trainer:
 16 – Bob Baffert (1996–2002, 2008, 2009, 2011, 2012, 2014, 2016, 2018, 2021, 2022)

Most wins by an owner:
 5 – Golden Eagle Farm (1990, 1992, 1993, 1997, 1998)

Winners

References

 The Del Mar Futurity at Pedigree Query
 The Del Mar Futurity at the NTRA

Del Mar Racetrack
Horse races in California
Flat horse races for two-year-olds
Grade 1 stakes races in the United States
Graded stakes races in the United States
Recurring sporting events established in 1948
1948 establishments in California